The Women's 200 metre freestyle event at the 2002 Commonwealth Games was held on 30 July at the Manchester Aquatics Centre.

Records
Prior to this competition, the existing records were as follows:

The following records were established during the competition:

Results

Heats
The 8 fastest swimmers in the heats qualified for the semifinals.

Final
The final was held on 30 July at 19:00.

References

Women's 200 metre freestyle